Palladio is a composition for string orchestra by Karl Jenkins, written in 1995, with the title referring to the Italian Renaissance architect Andrea Palladio (1508–1580). The work in three movements is in the form of a concerto grosso.

Composition 

Composed between 1993 and 1995, the piece is a suite of three movements in the form of a concerto grosso for string orchestra, named Palladio, in reverence of the Renaissance architect.

Palladio was published in 1996 by Boosey & Hawkes. It takes about 16 minutes to perform. The composer comments: 

"Harmonious proportions and mathematics" play a role in music as in architecture. The architect Palladio based his designs on antique Roman models and studied  especially the measurements of Vitruvius. Jenkins in turn based his music on Palladio's "harmonious mathematical principles".

The music, especially the first movement, has been arranged for different ensembles, including wind quintet and wind band. Jenkins made a version for piano and used the motifs of movement I for an aria "Exultate jubilate", related to his 70th birthday.

Scoring and structure 

The piece in three movements is scored for string orchestra.

Allegretto
Largo
Vivace

Recording 

Palladio is featured on a 1996 CD Diamond Music, played by members of the London Philharmonic Orchestra, conducted by the composer. It is combined with other music by Jenkins including variations from Adiemus and his second string quartet. Movement I appears in other collections, such as Karl Jenkins & Adiemus: The Essential Collection.

Commercial use 

Motifs of the first movement, Allegretto, were used for a TV commercial of De Beers, "A Diamond Is Forever", from 1993.

Escala version
The English string quartet Escala recorded a version of Palladio in 2009 which featured on their self-titled debut album, following their appearance on the second series of Britain's Got Talent. It was released as a single and peaked at number 39 on the UK Singles Chart in the week ending 6 June 2009. The single spent one week in the top 40.

References

External links 
 De Beers Diamonds Arrangement for piano, fortepiano.szm.com

Compositions by Karl Jenkins
1995 compositions
Compositions for string orchestra
Compositions in D minor